The Definitive Collection, released in June 2006, is a greatest hits albums by the British musical group Level 42. The album peaked at #20 on the UK album charts.

Track listing 
Lessons in Love (from "Running in the Family")
Sun Goes Down (Living It Up) (from "Standing in the Light")
Heaven In My Hands (from "Staring at the Sun")
Something About You (from "World Machine")
Hot Water (from "True Colours")
Chinese Way (from "The Pursuit of Accidents")
Leaving Me Now (from "World Machine")
Running in the Family (from "Running in the Family")
To Be With You Again (from "Running in the Family")
Tracie (from "Staring at the Sun")
It's Over (from "Running in the Family")
Micro Kid (from "Standing in the Light")
Children Say (from "Running in the Family")
Love Games (from "Level 42")
Turn It On (from "Level 42")
Starchild (from "Level 42")
Take a Look (from "Staring at the Sun")
Take Care Of Yourself (from "Level Best")

Personnel
 Mark King - Vocals, Bass Guitar
 Mike Lindup - Keyboards, Vocals
 R. "Boon" Gould - Guitars (Tracks 1,2,4-9,11-16)
 Phil Gould - Drums (Tracks 1,2,4-9,11-16)
 Gary Husband - Drums (Tracks 3,10,17 & 18)
 Alan Murphy - Guitars (Tracks 3,10,17 & 18)
 Wally Badarou - Keyboards, Vocals

Level 42 albums
2006 greatest hits albums
Polydor Records compilation albums